Vair is a town in Trinity County, Texas, located on Highway 94.  It was established after 1900.

References

Unincorporated communities in Trinity County, Texas
Unincorporated communities in Texas